Noah R. Newby was a teacher and state legislator in North Carolina. He was African American.

He taught in various areas and reported acquiring land as well as a horse and buggy.

He had a farm in Pasquotank County and taught in Elizabeth City. He served in the legislature in 1883 and opposed legislation limiting funding for schools serving African Americans.

References

African-American state legislators in North Carolina
19th-century African-American politicians
19th-century American politicians
Year of birth missing
Year of death missing
People from Elizabeth City, North Carolina